Angela Tosheva Tosheva, Ph.D (Bulgarian:  Д-р Анжела Тошева Тошева; born 15 June 1961 in Sofia),
is a Bulgarian freelance pianist, chamber musician, piano and chamber music pedagogue, editor and with Michail Goleminov director of Orange Factory psychoacoustic arts and music publishing house, Sofia, Bulgaria.

Biography
She graduated from the Sofia Academy of Music in 1984. A milestone in her development was meeting Gyorgy Sebok on his summer master classes in Hungary and Switzerland. She has also studied with Ketil Haugsand.

Ph.D
In 1991 Tosheva defended her doctoral degree on "The Theory of interpretation in chamber music", on which she worked for five years, while teaching chamber music at the Academy of Music in Sofia as an assistant to Prof. Dimitar Kozev.

As a performer
As a performer she has had numerous solo and chamber music concerts in Bulgaria, with music ranging from William Byrd and Couperin to Ligeti and Adams and with Bulgarian contemporary composers such as Lazar Nikolov, Konstantin Iliev, Ivan Spassov, Vassil Kazandjiev, Michail Goleminov, Georgi Arnaoudov, making her one of the most passionate promoters of contemporary music in Bulgaria.

"A rare mixture of rigor and flexibility are typical and essential for her performance. Her music is the result of a deep and vibrant 'Slavonic' sound, serving a pure, clear-sighted vision."

Abroad, she has performed in the USA, Canada, Brazil, Portugal, Ireland, Norway, France, Italy, Russia, Turkey. She led an international master class in Bordeaux, France, in 1996. In 1997 she was invited by the São Paulo University Music Department to render a seminar on contemporary music and Béla Bartók's works for piano, as well as to perform twelve concerts for contemporary and classical music.

As an editor
As an editor with Michail Goleminov, celebrating the bicentenary of the births of Chopin and Schumann, Orange Factory has released in Bulgarian Regard Sur Chopin, ed. Fayard (Поглед към Шопен, ed. Orange Factory) and Schumann, ed. Seuil (Шуман, ed. Orange Factory) by André Boucourechliev (translated in Bulgarian by Pavlina Ribarova and Zornitsa Kitinska).

Prizes
Prizes she has received include first prize at the international competition in Salerno 1978, the Usti and Labem Award at the age of 12, first prize at the Bulgarian Liszt-Bartók Competition in 1988. She has been awarded the "Golden Feather" award from Classic FM Sofia radio, 1997, the award of the Polish Institute in Sofia for the 2010 Chopin year, 2010, the award of the Bulgarian "Salon of Arts" together with Michail Goleminov for his multimedia installation "Schuman-Oracle" and her concerts promoting Schumann's bicentenary, 2010.

Orange Factory
In 2003 she and the composer Michail Goleminov founded The Orange Factory Psychoacoustic Arts, an experimental music and multimedia studio and publishing house in Sofia, Bulgaria.

Freelance artist
Angela Tosheva has been living since 2001 as a freelance artist.

Discography

Notes

References
 angelatosheva.com
 www.orangefactory.net

1961 births
Living people
Bulgarian pianists
Musicians from Sofia
21st-century pianists
Women classical pianists